The men's freestyle flyweight competition at the 1960 Summer Olympics in Rome took place from 1 to 6 September at the Basilica of Maxentius. Nations were limited to one competitor.

Competition format

This freestyle wrestling competition continued to use the "bad points" elimination system introduced at the 1928 Summer Olympics for Greco-Roman and at the 1932 Summer Olympics for freestyle wrestling, though adjusted the point values slightly. Wins by fall continued to be worth 0 points and wins by decision continued to be worth 1 point. Losses by fall, however, were now worth 4 points (up from 3). Losses by decision were worth 3 points (consistent with most prior years, though in some losses by split decision had been worth only 2 points). Ties were now allowed, worth 2 points for each wrestler. The elimination threshold was also increased from 5 points to 6 points. The medal round concept, used in 1952 and 1956 requiring a round-robin amongst the medalists even if one or more finished a round with enough points for elimination, was used only if exactly three wrestlers remained after a round—if two competitors remained, they faced off head-to-head; if only one, he was the gold medalist.

Results

Round 1

 Bouts

 Points

Round 2

 Bouts

 Points

Round 3

Kropp's head-to-head victory over Rosado in round 1 was the tie-breaker for 11th place.

 Bouts

 Points

Round 4

 Bouts

 Points

Round 5

Simons's victory over Aliyev in round 4 was the tie-breaker for 5th place.

 Bouts

 Points

Round 6

 Bouts

 Points

Round 7

Seifpour was eliminated at 6 points, earning bronze. Bilek and Matsubara were the only remaining wrestlers, each at 5 points; they had wrestled in the first round, with Bilek winning, so Bilek took gold on the head-to-head tie-breaker.

 Bouts

 Points

References

Wrestling at the 1960 Summer Olympics